The 2001 World Weightlifting Championships were held in Antalya, Turkey from November 4 to November 11. The men's competition in the bantamweight (56 kg) division was staged on 4 November 2001.

Medalists

Records

Results

New records

References
Weightlifting World Championships Seniors Statistics, Page 34 

2001 World Weightlifting Championships